Tchoung Ta-tchen or Zhong Dazhen was a martial arts teacher who developed his own version of Yang-style t'ai chi ch'uan. He died on February 22, 2000.

Dual method of the Old Form of Yang-style t'ai chi ch'uan
Tchoung Ta-tchen developed his own form based on the Yang style of t'ai chi ch'uan.

As a young man Tchoung studied his family's style of t'ai chi ch'uan and tui na (massage). He also was a track athlete. He became a professional soldier and Army officer.

In 1943, he studied qigong and t'ai chi ch'uan with Abbott Hui Kung, at the Omei Monastery in Sichuan province. He learned baguazhang and I-ch'uan from his friend Wang Shu Chin and Xingyiquan from his friend Yuan Tao.  

Tchoung studied with Shi Tiao Mei who was a student of Tian Shaolin. Tian was a disciple of Yang Chien-hou. 

Tchoung Ta-tchen also studied with Hsiung Yang-ho, who was one of the few disciples of Yang Shao-hou. Hsiung also taught Tchoung's friend Liang Tsung-tsai. Tchoung and Liang were workout partners. Tchoung was also a pushing hands partner of Cheng Man-ch'ing. Liang was Cheng's teaching assistant in Taiwan but had several other teachers as well. Kuo Lien Ying was another of Tchoung's practice partners.

Tchoung was a member of the Taiwan-based Chinese Tai Chi Ch'uan Association. The CTCCA was a multi style group of t'ai chi ch'uan masters. The CTCCA made Tchoung a delegate and he traveled to Africa to teach President Bongo of Gabon t'ai chi ch'uan. Tchoung then traveled to South Africa where he taught for some time. Eventually he moved to Vancouver BC, Canada. He taught in Vancouver and Seattle, Washington.

Continued teaching of his system
His students who continue to teach his system include Andrew Dale, Harvey Kurland, Tim Glasheen, Peter Dickson, Laurens Lee, and Donald Scott. Tchoung Ta-chen taught his evolving version of t'ai chi ch'uan in Vancouver, British Columbia, and in Seattle, Washington. His primary school was in Vancouver's Chinatown. He became a popular t'ai chi ch'uan teacher in the Pacific Northwest in the 1970s.

Public ceremony in 1986
Tchoung officially authorized a few of his advanced students to teach his system. In a public ceremony in 1986 Tchoung said only five students in the USA could teach his system at that time. Those were Carey Brooks, Andrew Dale, David Harris, Harvey Kurland and Don Scott. There are several teachers of his system who are currently teaching, including the following direct students in the United States: Andrew Dale, David Harris, Don Scott in Seattle, Washington and Harvey Kurland in Riverside, California. Several of his students are teaching in Canada, including Tim Glasheen in Vancouver, BC, Peter Dickson in Terrace, BC, John Camp in White Rock, BC, and Eric Eastman in Nelson, BC, Canada. Most of Tchoung's official students pictures can be found in Tchoung's text (Tchoung 1995).

Philosophy 
According to Kurland, "Tchoung's philosophy was to teach his students everything he could. Not hold back, as many teachers did. That is the reason so many students left their previous schools to study with him. He tells his students from the beginning that he can teach them the method, but it is up to them as to what they do with it. That is if they do not train hard, they will not achieve their potential. He says there are no magical secret, just hard training and coaching. He saw that there was a decay in t'ai-chi ch'uan quality in China and the world. That is the art was becoming conceptually a calisthenics exercise or performance art, and the old martial value and traditional method was being lost." 

"Tchoung felt the previous generation's skill being lost or watered down was due to the concept of always holding a little back from the student (as well as intentional persecuting of the art and modernizing it on the mainland). So every generation lost a little more, so now even the top names were merely shells of the older art, very few had any real skill."

References

 Black Belt Magazine, "The Web of Tai Chi Chuan", July, 1988, 104–108.
 Tchoung Ta-tchen, The Annotated and Theoretical T'ai Chi Ch'uan, Vancouver BC, 1995. This book  features his 120 movement short form, pushing hands and san shou. His book has pictures of his official students.
 Kurland, Harvey, "Who Was Grandmaster Tchoung Ta-tchen?", Internal Wushu Arts Newsletter, 1999
 Kurland, Harvey, "Energy Expenditure of Tai chi chuan students", Journal of Sports Medicine, Training and Rehabilitation, 1992, Vol. #3, p 228.
 Kurland, Harvey, Asian Mind-Body Techniques, 2007,  p218-219.
 CTCCA 1996 Conference, Vancouver, BC, Canada
 Video: Tchoung Ta-tchen Workshop in Seattle 1996
 Video: Symmetrical Yang Style T'ai-Chi Ch'uan Vol. 1: The First 10 Movements of the 28 Form
 Video: Symmetrical Yang Style T'ai-Chi Ch'uan Volume Two: The Complete 28 Form (Amazon)

External links
  Who Is Tchoung Ta-tchen? 
 NWTCCA in So Cal NW Tai Chi Chuan Association in Southern California Tai Chi in Seattle
 CTCCA 1996 Conference
 
 

Chinese tai chi practitioners
2000 deaths
Year of birth missing